Annabelle Laure Ali (born 4 March 1985) is a female freestyle wrestler from Cameroon. She participated in the Women's Freestyle 72 kg event at the 2008 Summer Olympics, where she lost in the 1/8 final to Agnieszka Wieszczek.  At the 2012 Summer Olympics, she lost to Stanka Zlateva in the quarterfinals.  As Zlateva proceeded to the final, Ali was part of the bronze medal repechage, where she lost to Vasilisa Marzaliuk.  At the 2012 Summer Olympics, she was also the Cameroonian flag-bearer at the opening ceremony.

At the 2014 Commonwealth Games, she won the silver medal in the women's -75 kg division.

Major results

References

External links
 
 

Living people
1985 births
People from Far North Region (Cameroon)
Wrestlers at the 2008 Summer Olympics
Wrestlers at the 2012 Summer Olympics
Wrestlers at the 2016 Summer Olympics
Olympic wrestlers of Cameroon
Wrestlers at the 2010 Commonwealth Games
Commonwealth Games silver medallists for Cameroon
Cameroonian female sport wrestlers
Wrestlers at the 2014 Commonwealth Games
Commonwealth Games medallists in wrestling
African Games gold medalists for Cameroon
African Games medalists in wrestling
Competitors at the 2015 African Games
African Wrestling Championships medalists
20th-century Cameroonian women
21st-century Cameroonian women
Medallists at the 2014 Commonwealth Games